Carlo, Maria Rocco Francesco Saverio Brioschi (15 August 1782 in Milan – 29 January 1833 in Naples) was an Italian astronomer and geodesist, professor of astronomy at the University of Naples and director of the Astronomical Observatory of Capodimonte.
On the evening of 17 December 1819, he made the first astronomical observation from the new Capodimonte Observatory by measuring the zenith distance of α Cassiopeiae with the Reichenbach multiplier (or repeater) circle housed in the east dome.
In 1824 he published the first and only volume of his stellar catalog: Comentarj astronomici della Specola reale di Napoli.

Note

Bibliography

See also 

1782 births
1833 deaths
19th-century Italian astronomers
Scientists from Naples